Defy Ventures is a United States-based 501(c)(3) nonprofit organization founded in 2010 by Catherine Hoke (née ROHR’s). The organization's goal is to address the social problems of mass incarceration, recidivism, and related issues by providing well-being, entrepreneurship, employment, and personal development training programs to individuals with criminal histories.

History 

Defy Ventures was founded in October 2010 in New York City, with a plan to build a replicable model that would work in urban communities in the U.S. In January 2012, it launched its pilot group of entrepreneurs-in-training (EITs) and in the fall of 2012 opened up enrollment to women.

The organization offers combined face-to-face and video courses consisting of well-being, entrepreneurship training, personal development, mentoring, business incubation, financing opportunities, and network development.  In July 2015, it launched its CEO of Your New Life program, which teaches job readiness, well-being, entrepreneurship, technology basics, personal finance, etiquette, and personal development, to incarcerated men and women. The program also provides follow-up, with post-release job placement, entrepreneurship startup funding, and mentoring.

As of 2015, over 100 companies have been started by Defy's EITs and over 3,000 businesspeople have become involved as volunteers, judges and mentors for EITs.

In 2015 the program was expanded to the Bay Area,  and to Southern California in 2016 and in Connecticut and Colorado in 2017. The organization currently offers programming through both chapters and independent affiliates (under license) in California, Colorado, Washington State, New York, Connecticut, and Illinois.

Programs 
Defy offers prison-based and community-based entrepreneurship, personal development and career readiness programming. Program participants are called Entrepreneurs in Training, or EITs.

Its signature program, CEO of Your New Life (CEO YNL) includes six to eight months of coursework. Content is delivered through textbooks and supplemental DVDs. All courses feature in- person discussion groups and/or facilitation. The   program is provided in prisons and transitional facilities. 

Defy’s Alumni Association programming includes career and reentry support designed to support EITs who have completed CEO YNL either in custody or in the community through the critical first 90 days of reentry and beyond. It includes skills-based workshops, community building activities, and service activities.

Defy's post-release entrepreneurship programs include the Entrepreneurship Bootcamp and the Business Accelerator.  The Entrepreneurship Bootcamp is a 14-week entrepreneurship course, delivered online and in person, and is open to any formerly incarcerated adults. The Business Accelerator is a selective program for graduates of the Bootcamp or CEOYNL, and includes advanced coursework in entrepreneurship and business management, supporting EITs through the process of launching new businesses. Accelerator EITs are eligible to pitch for seed capital after completing all the requirements of the program. All programs include support from volunteer coaches.

See also
 Social entrepreneurship
 United States incarceration rate

References

External links
 

Law enforcement non-governmental organizations in the United States
Charities based in New York City
Social enterprises
2010 establishments in New York City
American companies established in 2010